Parantica pseudomelaneus is a species of nymphalid butterfly in the subfamily Danainae. It is endemic to Indonesia.

References

Parantica
Butterflies of Indonesia
Endemic fauna of Indonesia
Taxonomy articles created by Polbot
Butterflies described in 1883